Sclerocecis is a genus of moth in the family Gelechiidae. It contains the species Sclerocecis pulverosella, which is found in Algeria.

The wingspan is about 11 mm.

The larvae feed on Limoniastrum guyonanum.

References

Gelechiinae